Anna Kournikova and Barbara Schett were the defending champions, but played this year with different partners. Kournikova teamed up with Martina Hingis and reached the final before been forced to withdraw, while Schett teamed up with Silvia Farina Elia and lost in semifinals.

Lisa Raymond and Rennae Stubbs won the title by walkover, after Hingis had to withdraw due to a heat exhaustion and a minor thigh injury. It was the 28th title for Raymond and the 32nd title for Stubbs in their respective doubles careers.

Seeds

Draw

Draw

Qualifying

Qualifying seeds

Qualifiers
  Henrieta Nagyová /  Iroda Tulyaganova

Qualifying draw

References

External links
 Main and Qualifying draws
 ITF tournament profile

Women's Doubles
Doubles